Epagoge metacentra is a species of moth of the family Tortricidae. It is found in India.

References

Moths described in 1918
Archipini